Comobabi is both a census-designated place (CDP) and a populated place in Pima County, Arizona, United States. The population was 8 at the 2010 census.  It is located within the Tohono O'odham Indian Reservation.

Geography
Comobabi is located at  (32.053847, −111.802885).

Demographics

As of the 2010 census, there were 8 people living in the CDP: 4 male and 4 female. 1 was 19 years old or younger, 1 was ages 20–34, 1 was between the ages of 35 and 49, 4 were between 50 and 64, and the remaining 1 was aged 65 and above. The median age was 53.0 years.

The racial makeup of the CDP was 100% Native American.  0% of the population were Hispanic or Latino of any race.

There were 3 households in the CDP, 2 family households (66.7%) and 1 non-family households (33.3%), with an average household size of 2.67. Of the family households, there were 1 married couples living together, and 1 single mothers.

The CDP contained 5 housing units, of which 3 were occupied and 2 were vacant.

References

Census-designated places in Pima County, Arizona
Tohono O'odham Nation